Antonio Tartaglione (born 21 August 1998) is an Italian football player. He plays for Aglianese as a midfielder.

Club career

Pistoiese 
On 3 September 2017, Tartaglione made his professional debut for Pistoiese as a starter in a 1–0 home win over Monza, he was replaced by Gregorio Luperini in the 56th minute. On 15 October he scored his first professional goal in the 25th minute of a 2–2 home draw against Lucchese. On 23 October he played his first entire match, a 2–2 away draw against Pontedera. His contract with Pistoiese was dissolved by mutual consent on 30 November 2019.

Aglianese
On 1 December 2019, he joined Aglianese in Serie D.

Career statistics

Club

References

External links 
 

1998 births
Sportspeople from Livorno
Living people
Italian footballers
Association football midfielders
U.S. Pistoiese 1921 players
Serie C players
Serie D players
Footballers from Tuscany
Aglianese Calcio 1923 players